Boris Sergeyevich Stechkin (1891–1969) was a Russian Empire scientist, engineer and inventor. He developed a theory of heat engines and was involved in construction of many Soviet aircraft engines. He was also co-developer of Sikorsky Ilya Muromets (the first four-engine airplane and bomber, 1913) and Lebedenko's Tsar Tank (the largest armored vehicle in history, 1916–1917). He died in Moscow on April 2, 1969.

See also 
 List of Russian inventors

References 
 Stechkin's biography at The Heroes of the Country 
 Lebedenko (or Tsar) Tank

Inventors from the Russian Empire
Full Members of the USSR Academy of Sciences
1891 births
1969 deaths
Burials at Novodevichy Cemetery
Academic staff of Moscow Aviation Institute
Soviet inventors
Central Aerohydrodynamic Institute employees
Baranov Central Institute of Aviation Motors employees